Pasar pagi (Malay/Indonesian, lit.: 'morning market') is a type of traditional market found in Indonesia and Malaysia, sometimes classified as a wet market.

Operating hours

Pasar pagi mostly operate from early morning to the afternoon. Nevertheless, there is also a related traditional market called pasar malam (lit. 'night market'). The difference between pasar pagi and pasar malam is in its operating hours. Pasar pagi opens early in the morning from dawn to the noon every day, approximately from 04:00 to 12:00. On the other hand, pasar malam opens at night, approximately from 17:00 to 22:00, and only on selected days of a week. 

The type of goods being sold is also quite different. Pasar pagi is where many housewives, domestic helps and local folks appear to shop their daily needs, mostly uncooked fresh produce. The things which are on sale are usually fresh daily produce, including fruits, vegetables, spices, fish, meat, eggs, and all kinds of daily products. While pasar malam is more to cater a leisurely shopping and eating-out activity, selling ready to eat food, snacks, clothing and various knick-knacks.

Indonesia
In Indonesia, practically all traditional markets are pasar pagi, open from early in the dawn to mid day. Often the stalls are temporarily overflow occupying nearby streets around the marketplace — which normally open for traffic in other hours of the day. They sell fresh produces, such as vegetables, fruits, chicken, meat and fish. The major pasar pagi in Jakarta are Pasar Pagi Mangga Dua, Pasar Induk Kramat Jati, Pasar Minggu and Pasar Senen. Pasar Minggu specialized on fruits and vegetables, while Pasar Senen specialized on selling kue, as they offer a rich variety of traditional Indonesian snack, open every subuh (dawn).

Malaysia
In Malaysia, one of the biggest pasar pagi is at Pasar Pudu at Pudu and Jalan Pasar at Chow Kit area in Kuala Lumpur.

In March 2020, all wet markets (including pasar pagi) were temporarily banned from operating due to the COVID-19 pandemic.

See also

 Bazaar
 Hawker centre, open-air complexes in Malaysia and Singapore housing many stalls that sell a variety of inexpensive food
 Kopi tiam ('coffee shop')
 Market (place)
 Pasar malam ('night market')
 Retail
 Wet market

References

Indonesian culture
Malaysian culture
Singaporean culture
Malay words and phrases
Retail markets